Marcus Thornton may refer to:

 Marcus Thornton (basketball, born 1987), American professional basketball player, drafted by the Miami Heat; in college played for LSU (2007–09)
 Marcus Thornton (basketball, born 1992), American professional basketball player; undrafted; in college played for Georgia (2010–15)
 Marcus Thornton (basketball, born 1993), American professional basketball player, drafted by the Boston Celtics; in college played for William & Mary (2011–15)
 Marcus Thornton, petitioner in the United States Supreme Court case Thornton v. United States, 541 U.S. 615 (2004)